Red Animal War is a rock band from Dallas, Texas that started in 1998 as Jeff Wilganoski, Jamie Shipman, Matt Pittman, and Justin Wilson. During the recording of their first album, Brian Pho replaced Jamie Shipman. Jeff Davis replaced Brian Pho in 2004, and Tony Wann came on as second drums later that year. Todd Harwell replaced Jeff Wilganoski in 2006, and after a SXSW performance the band went on indefinite hiatus. Frontman Justin Wilson has revealed the band is working on vinyl reissues and has a "full album demoed and partly recorded".

They released four records and two seven-inches, and showed up on many compilations. They toured Europe three times and North America many times over. J. Robbins, Ed Rose and Darrell LaCour produced records for them and the band gets their name from this quote:

"The greater part of the untested men appeared quiet and absorbed. They were going to look at war, the red animal—war, the blood-swollen god." - Stephen Crane, The Red Badge of Courage.

Band members
Justin Wilson - vocals, guitar
Matt Pittman - guitar, vocals
Brian Pho - bass
Jeff Wilganoski - drums

Discography

Albums
Breaking In An Angel - (April 24, 2001 · Deep Elm Records)
Black Phantom Crusades - (September 17, 2002 · Deep Elm Records)
Polizida - (2004 · Ice Planet Records)
Seven Year War - (2006 ·  End Sounds)

Splits
Red Animal War/Slowride [EP] - (2002 · Deep Elm Records)

Compilations
Unreleased No. 1:Deep Elm (Various)
Emo Diaries No. 4: An Ocean Of Doubt
Too Young To Die: Preventing Youth Suicide
Sampler No. 5: Deep Elm - This is How I Kill My Tears
Sampler No. 4: Deep Elm - Hearts Bleed Blue
Sampler No. 3: Sound Spirit Fury Fire (2001)

See also
Brian Pho
vOLUMe
The Numbers Twist
Hanoi
Sun Alive

References 

 http://www.dallasobserver.com/2001-03-15/music/scene-heard/ Scene, Heard. It's a big fuckin' deal By Zac Crain Published on March 15, 2001
 http://www.dallasobserver.com/2002-08-29/music/get-the-feelin/ Get the Feelin' Red Animal War to release new album By Zac Crain Published on August 29, 2002
 http://www.dallasobserver.com/2003-03-13/calendar/life-preserver/ Life Preserver Deep Elm Records looks out for those Too Young To Die By Shannon Sutlief Published on March 13, 2003
 http://www.dallasobserver.com/2001-06-21/music/war-stories/ War Stories Or: What do confiscated videotapes, cops and stolen apples have to do with Red Animal War? By Zac Crain Published on June 21, 2001
 http://www.dallasobserver.com/2006-01-26/music/spune-180-s-back2school/ Spune's Back2School Saturday, January 28, at Hailey's By Sam Machkovech Published on January 26, 2006
 http://www.splendidmagazine.com/review.html?reviewid=32468188362152315 Splendid Magazine Review of Black Phantom Crusades 12/07/2002 By Evanston Wade
 http://www.interpunk.com/bandinfo.cfm?band=4737& Interpunk - Red Animal War
 https://www.amazon.co.uk/Black-Phantom-Crusades-Red-Animal/dp/B00006JKB8 Amazon Music Review of Black Phantom Crusades 01/26/2005
 https://web.archive.org/web/20120320071921/http://music.msn.com/music/album-review/red-animal-war/breaking-in-an-angel/ Breaking In An Angel Album Review By Kurt Morris, AMG
 http://www.deepelm.com/sum/395_sum.html Deep Elm Records Breaking In An Angel Reviews
 http://www.deepelm.com/sum/412_sum.html Deep Elm Records Red Animal War/Slowride Split EP Reviews
 http://www.deepelm.com/sum/419_sum.html Deep Elm Records Black Phantom Crusades Reviews

External links
Deep Elm Records
Red Animal War

Alternative rock groups from Texas
Indie rock musical groups from Texas
Musical groups from Dallas
Musical groups established in 1998